Olson Island is the largest and northernmost of the ice-covered White Islands, in southern Sulzberger Bay. The feature is rudely delineated on the map of the Byrd Antarctic Expedition, 1928–30, and is indicated as "low ice cliffs" that rise above the ice shelf in this part of the bay. It was mapped in detail by the United States Geological Survey (USGS) from surveys and U.S. Navy air photos, 1959–65. It was named for Michael L. Olson, United States Antarctic Research Program (USARP) ionospheric physicist at Byrd Station, winter party 1968, and a member of the Plateau Station summer party, 1968–69.

See also 
 List of antarctic and sub-antarctic islands

Islands of the Ross Dependency
King Edward VII Land